Caloptilia speciosella is a moth of the family Gracillariidae. It is known from Ohio and Kentucky in the United States.

The larvae feed on Acer rubrum. They mine the leaves of their host plant. The mine has the form of a small transparent blotch. In its earliest linear stage, it is an underside mine, situated in the angle at the base of one of the heavier veins.

References

speciosella
Moths of North America
Moths described in 1939